Sekolah Menengah Sains Sabah (abbreviated SMESH) is a fully residential school established in Malaysian state of Sabah. As the first fully residential school in East Malaysia and the 27th of its kind in Malaysia, SMESH was previously known as Sekolah Berasrama Penuh Sabah (SBPS). SMESH was established in 1978 but became fully operational on 1 January 1984. It has a  permanent campus in Bukit Padang, Kota Kinabalu. Due to the unsafe state of the campus, SMESH is temporarily operated in a temporary campus in Tuaran.

History 
The idea of having a fully residential school in Sabah was initiated in 1970s. Although SBPS was established in 1978, SBPS started its operation on 1 January 1984 under the leadership of its Founding Principal, Mohd. Radzwan Mohd. Yusof with the assistance of one teacher, Abd Halim Ismail. The first group of SBPS students were enrolled on 26 May 1984. SBPS was renamed as SMESH by the Ministry of Education (MOE) on 12 April 1997. Prior to 2011, SMESH was made a Smart School and a Cluster of Excellence School.

On 26 May 2011, Education Minister Muhyiddin Yassin declared SMESH a High Performance School. As such, SMESH was given considerable autonomy powers from MOE. For many years, including in 2018, SMESH was ranked the best secondary school in Sabah based on public examination results achieved by students and the school. In 2014, SMESH became the second best school in Malaysia based on Malaysian Certificate of Education (SPM) 2013 results.

In 2015, Ministry of Works declared the permanent campus of SMESH in Kota Kinabalu unsafe. Consequently, SMESH was relocated to Tuaran. The old campus of Kent Teaching Education Institute was set up as the temporary campus of SMESH at the end of 2015.

In March 2018, Education Minister Mahdzir Khalid announced that RM 72 million was provided rebuild the permanent campus under Najib Government. Assistant Minister of State Jimmy Wong later revealed, in July 2018, that the real cost of rebuilding the permanent campus is RM 74.2 million and that the project is still at pre-implementation level.

In July 2018, SMESH was selected as the second school in Malaysia and the first in Sabah to go cashless by MobilityOne.

Leadership 

SMESH is led by a senior-grade Principal appointed by MOE. He is later assisted by a Management Council comprising all three Vice Principals and four Head of Departments.

Since the inception of SBPS/SMESH in 1984, six Principals took the helm of the school. Zaini Zair is the Principal of SMESH since 2008. The following principals preceded him were:

 1984–1987: Mohd. Radzwan Mohd. Yusof
 1987–1994: Adnan Ibrahim
 1994–1996: Abbas Awang
 1997–2005: Wahid Kapal
 2005–2008: Rossminah Yamin

Facilities 
In accordance with the status of SMESH as a top school in Sabah, SMESH was equipped with completed facilities. the permanent campus of SMESH has a main hall, four science labs, three workshops, a computer lab, a sports complex, a Muslim prayer hall and two blocks of student accommodation. In addition to Internet access points installed at strategic places around the school, students were given permission to bring own laptops to the school under a set of terms and conditions set by the school.

Achievements 
Since 1984, SMESH has recorded numerous achievements at various fields and levels. In academic, SMESH was made the best school in Sabah for 2018 based on SPM 2017 results. In co-curricular activities, SMESH has been the top school in district-level Interschool Sports Championship. SMESH also received a gold medal in Fully Residential School International Symposium, the recent being in 2018. In administration and finance, SMESH was given a clean audit by the Auditor General.

Alumni 
Since 1984, SMESH has produced hundreds of notable alumni. One of them has been Isnaraissah Munirah Majilis who is Member of Parliament for Kota Belud and Deputy Minister of Energy, Technology, Science, Climate Change and Environment since 2018.

References

External links 

 SMESH official website

Buildings and structures in Kota Kinabalu
1984 establishments in Malaysia
Educational institutions established in 1984
Co-educational boarding schools